Hitomi Kuroki (Katakana:  Kuroki Hitomi; born October 5, 1960, in Kurogi-Machi, Yame District, Fukuoka, Japan) is a Japanese actress and film director. Her birth name is Shoko Ichiji ( Ichiji Shōko) née Egami ( Egami Shōko).

Kuroki was a cast member of the Takarazuka Revue, belonging to the Moon Troupe (Tsuki). Kuroki was the voice of Helen Parr/Elastigirl/Mrs. Incredible in the Japanese dub of The Incredibles. She won the award for best actress at the 22nd Hochi Film Award for Lost Paradise.

Selected filmography

As director
 Iya na Onna (2016)
 The Devil Wears Jūnihitoe (2020)

As actress

Film
Keshin (1986)
Lost Paradise (1997) - Rinko
Sada (1998) - Sada Abe
Spellbound (1999) - Hiroko Satō
Dark Water (2002) - Yoshimi Matsubara
Tokyo Tower (2005) - Shifumi
Hideo Nakata's Kaidan (2007) - Toyoshiga
20th Century Boys 1st-3rd (2008-2009) - Kiriko Endo
Utahime (2011) - Mieko
CM Time (2011)
When Marnie Was There (2014) - Hisako (voice)
The Crossing (2014)
Life in Overtime (2018)
The Lies She Loved (2018)
All About March (2020) - Maria Yamada
Majo no Kōsui (2023) - Yayoi Shiraishi

Television series
The Gate of Youth (1991) - Tae Ibuki
 Hachidai Shōgun Yoshimune (1995) - Kume
Ring: The Final Chapter (1999) - Rieko Miyashita
Majo no jouken (1999) - Kyoko Kurosawa
Golden Bowl (2002) - Hitomi Sakura
Good Luck!! (2003) - Noriko Togashi
Onihei Hankachō (2006) voice
Real Clothes SP (2008) - Jinbo Miki
Real Clothes (2009) - Jinbo Miki
GTO (2012) - Sakurai Ryoko
Gunshi Kanbei (2014) - One
Rakuen (2017) - Harumi Takahashi
Shukatsu Kazoku (2017) - Mizuki Tomikawa
Kahogo no Kahoko (2017) - Izumi Nemoto
Okehazama (2021), Dota Gozen

Variety and cultural shows
Waratte Iitomo
Japan Record Award - preside
Hey! Hey! Hey! Music Champ
DON! (video)

Stage (Takarazuka Revue)
Guys and Dolls - Sara
A Tale of Two Cities

Stage
Hamlet(1990)
Christmas Box
mama loves MAMBO (2000)
mama lobes MAMBOII (2002)
Hitomi Kuroki 25th anniversary Show "Musemore～talking&dancing" (2003)
mama loves MAMBOIII (2004)
MAMA LOVES mamboIV (2006)
Hitomi Kuroki 30th Dreaming Dinner show (2010)
Hitomi Kuroki is the reader the stage "Toritateya Oharu" (2010–2011)

Dubbing
Ballerina – Odette
The Incredibles – Elastigirl
Incredibles 2 – Elastigirl

References

External links

 
 

1960 births
Japanese film actresses
Japanese stage actresses
Japanese television actresses
Japanese television personalities
Japanese voice actresses
Living people
Actors from Fukuoka Prefecture
Takarazuka Revue
20th-century Japanese actresses
21st-century Japanese actresses